Brass City is the nickname of Waterbury, Connecticut, U.S.

Brass City may also refer to:
 Jamnagar, India
 Moradabad, India
 Bhandara, Maharashtra, India